MK1 may refer to:

Mark I (disambiguation), a first version of a product, frequently military hardware
 Volkswagen Golf Mk1, first-generation Volkswagen Golf
 Eagle Mk1, also known as the Eagle T1G, a Formula One racing car
 Mortal Kombat (1992 video game), the first game in the Mortal Kombat series
 MK1, a postcode in the MK postcode area